Arctia menetriesii, the Menetries' tiger moth, is a species of tiger moth in the family Erebidae. It was first described by Eduard Friedrich Eversmann in 1846. It is found in Karelia, Oktyabrskoe, northeastern Kazakhstan, Altai Mountains, Sayan Mountains, Evenkia, Yakutia, the central Amur region, Primorsky Krai and central Sakhalin. It was believed to be extinct in Fennoscandia, but the species has been recently recorded in Finland. This species is characterized by the fact that they never come to light; such behavior is atypical in the family Arctiidae.

Larvae feed on Aconitum rubicundum, Taraxacum, Plantago and Polygonum species.

This species was formerly the sole member of the genus Borearctia, but was transferred to Arctia as a result of phylogenetic research published by Rönkä et al. in 2016.

References

Further reading
Data about all species records were summarized in the paper: Bolotov, I. N.; Gofarov, M. Yu.; Kolosova, Yu. S. & Frolov, A. A. (2013). "Occurrence of Borearctia menetriesii (Eversmann, 1846) (Erebidae: Arctiinae) in Northern European Russia: a new locality in a disjunct species range". Nota Lepidopterologica. 36 (1): 65–75.

External links
 Atlas of Siberian Lepidoptera
 Records from Finland
 Conservation ecology of Borearctia menetriesii
 Fauna Europaea

Arctiina
Moths of Europe
Moths described in 1846
Monotypic moth genera